Maslenka is a rural locality (a village) in Novoalexandrovskoye Rural Settlement, Suzdalsky District, Vladimir Oblast, Russia. The population was 4 as of 2010. There are 3 streets.

Geography 
Maslenka is located 41 km southwest of Suzdal (the district's administrative centre) by road. Zeleni is the nearest rural locality.

References 

Rural localities in Suzdalsky District